Where the Ancestors' Souls Gathered is the debut studio album by Taiwanese black metal band Chthonic, released in 1999. The album was only available in Taiwan, and is now out of print and original copies of the album are very hard to find, though It is occasionally found online selling at high prices. The album was released in LP format by Fredmosa Records in 2002. This was the only album by the band that was never made in an alternative English version, however, English print does appear on certain areas of the artwork.

This is the band's only album with guitarist Null, bassist Xiao-Yu and drummer Xiao-Wang.

Track listing

Personnel
 Freddy Lim – vocals, erhu
 Null – guitar
 Xiao-Yu – bass
 Ambrosia – keyboards
 Xiao-Wang – drums

References

1999 albums
Chthonic (band) albums
Self-released albums